The following is a list of notable events and releases of the year 1995 in Norwegian music.

Events

April
 7 – The 22nd Vossajazz started in Voss, Norway (April 7 – 9).

May
 13 – Norway wins Eurovision Song Contest 1995 with the song "Nocturne", performed by Secret Garden.
 23 – The 23rd Nattjazz started in Bergen, Norway (May 23 – June 4).

June
 24 – The 26th Kalvøyafestivalen started at Kalvøya near by Oslo (June 24 – 25).

July
 17 – The 35th Moldejazz started in Molde, Norway (July 17 – 22).

Albums released

September
 13 – Kristin Lavransdatter (Kirkelig Kulturverksted), by Arild Andersen

Unknown date

H
 Morten Halle
 The Eagle (Curling Legs), with Jon Eberson, Bjørn Kjellemyr, and Pål Thowsen

Deaths

 November
 25 – Leif Juster, comedian, singer and actor (born 1910).

Births

 June

 July

 August
 8 – Malin Reitan, singer.
 31 – Celine Helgemo, singer and songwriter.

 Unknown date
 9 – Selma French Bolstad, Jazz, folk, and pop singer, fiddler, and composer.

See also
 1995 in Norway
 Music of Norway
 Norway in the Eurovision Song Contest 1995

References

 
Norwegian music
Norwegian
Music
1990s in Norwegian music